Self Explanatory is a 2009 album by Canadian rapper Classified (his twelfth album overall). The album received positive reviews from music critics. The first single "Anybody Listening", as of April 18, 2009, has spent 7 weeks on the Canadian Hot 100, peaking at #52. The third single "Oh...Canada" was also active on the charts, peaking at #14 on the Canadian Hot 100, went platinum in digital downloads and was the entrance music for Patrick Côté in UFC 113. In December 2017, the album was certified Gold in Canada.

Track listing 
All tracks produced by Classified.

Singles
"Trouble" (2008),
"Anybody Listening" (2009), #52
"Up All Night" (2009)
"Oh...Canada" (2009), #14
"Quit While You're Ahead" (2009)
"They Call This (Hip Hop)" (2010)

Chart positions

References

2009 albums
Classified (rapper) albums